Onetel is a Bangladeshi fixed line operator. It is a public switched telephone network operator in Bangladesh. As of May 2008, total number of subscribers was 37.796 thousand.

History
Onetel has obtained license from Bangladesh Telecommunication Regulatory Commission to provide fixed phone services in the northwestern part (Rajshahi Division) of Bangladesh.

Numbering scheme

Onetel uses the following numbering scheme for its subscribers:

+880 64 N1N2N3N4N5N6N7N8

where 880 is the International Subscriber Dialling Code for Bangladesh and is needed only in case of dialing from elsewhere. 

64 is the access code for RanksTel as allocated by the Government of Bangladesh. Omitting +880 requires using 0 instead to represent local call, hence 064 is the general access code.

Services
Onetel has established three customer service centres in Rajshahi, Bogra and Rangpur.

References

External links
Official website

Telecommunications companies of Bangladesh